Christos Pallakis (born 9 October 1971) is a Greek athlete. He competed in the men's pole vault at the 1992 Summer Olympics.

References

1971 births
Living people
Athletes (track and field) at the 1992 Summer Olympics
Greek male pole vaulters
Olympic athletes of Greece
Place of birth missing (living people)